New Broughton (standard ; sometimes) is a former industrial village located in Wrexham, North Wales. The population is 3,173, according to the 2001 census, increasing to 3,448 at the 2011 Census.

It is part of the wider Broughton local government community, and is situated between Southsea (to the North) and Caego (to the South). Still widely regarded a working-class area, in recent years, new housing estates have been built and attracted more middle-class families, who tend to live just outside the village, on the hill.

References

Villages in Wrexham County Borough